"Springtime in Vienna" is a song by Canadian rock group The Tragically Hip. It was released in May 1997 as the fifth and final single from their fifth studio album, Trouble at the Henhouse. The song peaked at number 11 on Canada's RPM Singles Chart.

On at least one occasion before his death in 2017, Gord Downie identified "Springtime in Vienna" as his own favourite song from the Tragically Hip repertoire.

Charts

Weekly charts

Year-end charts

References

1997 singles
The Tragically Hip songs